Rina Brown is a 2017 Bangladeshi film starring Shampa Reza, Saberi Alam and Indian actor Barun Chanda.  It was displayed at "Bangladesh National Film Festival - 2017". It is the 2nd film of director Shameem Akhtar, 13 years after her first film. The film deals with 1971's Indo-Pakistan war.

Cast
 Barun Chanda
 Saberi Alam
 Shampa Reza
 Jannatul Ferdoush Peya

References

Government of Bangladesh grants films

External links

Bengali-language Bangladeshi films
2017 films
2010s Bengali-language films
Films directed by Shameem Akhtar